Schwebsange is a small town in the commune of Schengen, in south-eastern Luxembourg.  , the town has a population of 277.

Remich (canton)
Towns in Luxembourg